Sceptobius is a genus of rove beetles in the family Staphylinidae. There are at least three described species in Sceptobius.

Species
These three species belong to the genus Sceptobius:
 Sceptobius dispar Sharp, 1883
 Sceptobius lativentris (Fenyes, 1909)
 Sceptobius schmitti (Wasmann, 1901)

References

Further reading

 
 
 
 
 

Aleocharinae
Articles created by Qbugbot